= Hey Chicken! =

Chinese fried chicken restaurant chain

Hey Chicken! (叫了个鸡), also known as "Chirpy Hut", is a chain of fried chicken restaurants originating in Shanghai in 2014. The restaurant has since spread to the West coast of the United States.

In China, the restaurant chain is infamous for their name: "叫了个鸡" translates to "ordered a chicken", but is a homophone for "叫了个妓" meaning "ordered a prostitute".
